The 1996–97 EHF Women's Cup Winners' Cup was the twenty-first edition of EHF's competition for women's handball national cup champions. It ran from October 11, 1996, to May 11, 1997.

Istochnik Rostov, a semifinalist in the previous EHF Cup, defeated 1992 EHF Cup champion VfB Leipzig in the final, becoming the first Russian team to win the Cup Winners' Cup after the dissolution of the Soviet Union. As of 2013 it remains the last final played by a German team, after five consecutive appearances including three wins.

Results

References

Women's EHF Cup Winners' Cup
1996 in handball
1997 in handball